Year 1064 (MLXIV) was a leap year starting on Thursday (link will display the full calendar) of the Julian calendar.

Events 
 By place 

 Europe 
 Summer – King Ferdinand I (the Great) conquers more territory in modern-day Portugal and captures Coimbra. He appoints Sisnando Davides to reorganise the economy and administer the lands encircling the city.
 European warriors go to Spain, to participate in the siege of Barbastro. This expedition is sanctioned by Pope Alexander II – and is now regarded as an early form of Crusade.
 Harold Godwinson, Earl of Wessex, is shipwrecked on the shores of Ponthieu (Normandy). He is captured by Count Guy I who takes him as hostage to his castle of Beaurian. 
 Duke William I (the Bastard) demands the release of Harold Godwinson from Guy I (after paid a ransom). Harold must swear an oath to aid William to the throne of England.
 Kings Harald Hardrada of Norway and Sweyn II of Denmark agree to a peace agreement. Harald turns his attentions to England where he believes he has a right to the throne.

 Seljuk Empire 
 April 27 – Alp Arslan, succeeds to the throne as sultan of the Seljuk Empire. He becomes sole ruler of Persia from the river Oxus to the Tigris. 
 The Seljuk Turks under Alp Arslan invade Anatolia, and capture Ani after a siege of 25-days. He sacks the city and slaughters its citizens.
 Badr al-Jamali, Fatimid governor of Syria, tries to engineer a pro-Fatimid coup in Aleppo; but the rebellion is suppressed by Musa Yabgu.

 Asia 
 King Bagrat IV of Georgia captures the fortress city of Samshvilde, the capital of the neighboring Tashir-Dzoraget.

 Mesoamerica 
 January 4 – The Aztecs migrate from Aztlán to the southern lands in central Mexico.

 By topic 

 Religion 
 Winter – Great German Pilgrimage: Archbishop Siegfried I of Mainz leads a pilgrimage to Jerusalem.
 Michaelsberg Abbey at Siegburg (modern Germany) is founded by Anno II, archbishop of Cologne.
 Construction of the Piazza dei Miracoli (known as Piazza del Duomo) at Pisa in Tuscany begins.

 Volcanology 
 Sunset Crater Volcano (modern-day Arizona) first erupts (approximate date)

Births 
 Adela of Flanders, queen of Denmark (approximate date)
 Beatrice I, countess of Bigorre (approximate date)
 Bořivoj II (or Borivoi), duke of Bohemia (approximate date)
 Danxia Zichun, Chinese Zen Buddhist monk (d. 1117)
 Hugh of Flavigny, French abbot (approximate date)
 Robert Fitz Richard, English nobleman (d. 1136)

Deaths 
 August 15 – Ibn Hazm, Andalusian historian and poet (b. 994)
 November 29 – Al-Kunduri, vizier of the Seljuk Empire (b. 1024)
 December 19 – Fujiwara no Nagaie, Japanese nobleman (b. 1005)
 Akkadevi, princess of the Chalukya Dynasty (b. 1010)
 Dromtön, Tibetan monk and founder of Reting Monastery
 Dub dá Leithe (or Dubhdalethe), Irish abbot
 Gozelo I (or Gozelon), count of Montaigu
 Llywelyn Aurdorchog, Welsh nobleman (approximate date)
 Yaakov ben Yakar, German Jewish rabbi (b. 990)
 Yi Yuanji, Chinese painter (approximate date)

References